Bob Swank is an American football coach.  He is the defensive coordinator, as well as the head coach of the lacrosse team at Chamblee Charter High School in Chamblee, Georgia. Swank served as the head football coach at Buffalo State College from 2001 to 2003, compiling a record of 4–25. 

A native of Hummelstown, Pennsylvania, Swank attended Lower Dauphin High School and Widener University in Chester, Pennsylvania, where he received a bachelor's degree in business administration in 1990. Swank began his coaching career as a graduate assistant at Midwestern State University in Wichita Falls, Texas from 1992 to 1993. He then coached at Methodist University in Fayetteville, North Carolinafrom 1994 to 2000 as an assistant, followed by his first head coaching job at Buffalo State College. Swank's final year of collegiate coaching was in 2004 after a one-year stint as a graduate assistant for the University of Akron football team.

Head coaching record

College

References

External links
 

Year of birth missing (living people)
Living people
Akron Zips football coaches
Buffalo State Bengals football coaches
Methodist Monarchs football coaches
Midwestern State Mustangs football coaches
High school football coaches in Georgia (U.S. state)
Midwestern State University alumni
Widener University alumni
People from Hummelstown, Pennsylvania